In enzymology, an anthranilate N-malonyltransferase is an enzyme that catalyzes the chemical reaction

malonyl-CoA + anthranilate  CoA + N-malonylanthranilate

Thus, the two substrates of this enzyme are malonyl-CoA and anthranilate, whereas its two products are CoA and N-malonylanthranilate.

This enzyme belongs to the family of transferases, specifically those acyltransferases transferring groups other than aminoacyl groups.  The systematic name of this enzyme class is malonyl-CoA:anthranilate N-malonyltransferase.

References

 

EC 2.3.1
Enzymes of unknown structure